Clément Morel was the defending champion, but did not compete in the Juniors in this year.

Marcos Baghdatis defeated Florin Mergea (6–4, 6–4) in the final.

Seeds

Draw

Finals

Top half

Section 1

Section 2

Bottom half

Section 3

Section 4

Sources
Draw

Boys' Singles
Australian Open, 2003 Boys' Singles